The Energy Tax Act (enacted November 9, 1978) is a law passed by the U.S. Congress as part of the National Energy Act. The objective of this law was to shift from oil and gas supply toward energy conservation; thus, to promote fuel efficiency and renewable energy through taxes and tax credits.

Tax credits for conservation 

This law gave an income tax credit to private residents who use solar, wind, or geothermal sources of energy. The credit is equal to 30% of the cost of the equipment up to $2000, as well as 20% of costs greater than $2000, up to a maximum of $10,000. There were also tax credits to businesses for renewable energy equipment, amounting to a maximum of 25% of the cost of the equipment.

The renewable energy credits of this law were increased by the Crude Oil Windfall Profits Tax Act of 1980.

Gas Guzzler Tax 

The Act also created the Gas Guzzler Tax which applies to the sales of vehicles with official EPA-estimated gas mileage below certain specified levels. In 1980, the tax was $200 for a fuel efficiency of 14 to 15 miles per gallon, and was increased to $1800 in 1985. In 1980, the tax was $550 for fuel efficiencies of 13 mpg and below, and was changed in 1986 to $3,850 for ratings below 12.5 mpg. The Gas Guzzler Tax applies only to passenger cars. Trucks, sport utility vehicles (SUV), and minivans are not covered because these vehicle types were not widely available in 1978 and were rarely used for non-commercial purposes.  The tax is collected by the Internal Revenue Service (IRS) and normally paid by the manufacturer or importer. The following chart shows the current tax for various levels of MPG that have been in effect since January 1, 1991.

The combined fuel economy MPG value (55% city, 45% highway) is used to determine tax liability. The MPG value is also adjusted slightly to account for differences in test procedures made since the base year, but it is not adjusted for in-use short fall. The unadjusted combined MPG of a vehicle can be approximated from the city and highway values provided in the Fuel Economy Guide by the following equation:

Since this is an approximate calculation, the actual gas guzzler tax may be off by one tax bracket.

Economic impact 
Gas guzzler tax creates incentive to meet the minimum MPG requirement by manufacturer. Due to elimination of vehicles that are below minimum MPG which is 22.5 MPG, vehicle sales have decreased approximately 0.5 percent. However, sales revenues increase by a greater amount due to the added value in vehicles making greater use of fuel economy technology. Currently, the additional cost of efficient hybrid systems can range from $2,000-$10,000 on the vehicle sticker price.

Manufacturers benefit from the increase in price of products. However, the fuel sector may lose revenue if the increase in sales and production of fuel efficient vehicles doesn't just encourage people to drive more.

Market impact 
The Gas Guzzler Tax led to the successive downsizing of most major American passenger autos, and the combination of the tax and late-'70s/early-'80s economic woes effectively killed the American full-size car as it had been known up to that point. Coincidentally, it only took one product cycle before the first modern SUVs were introduced, the Cherokee XJ and the S-10 Blazer (in 1984). By the time Ford introduced the Explorer, the SUV had become the common man's luxury vehicle and Ford capitalized on this using extensive cross-marketing, most notably with Northwest clothier Eddie Bauer.

Critics of the Gas Guzzler Tax contend that the increased fuel economy of the US passenger car fleet observed since 1978 must be considered in the context of the increased market share of mid-size and full-size SUVs. Many consumers' stated reasons for SUV purchase (comfort, interior room, and a perception of safety based on the vehicle's size) also apply to the now-obsolete American full-size car as produced from the 1920s through the 70s; critics contend that the dominance of the modern SUV is a direct result of the Gas Guzzler Tax, which could have applied to all consumer vehicles but does not.

See also
Energy law - United States
Vehicle Efficiency Initiative

Notes

External links
Energy tax credits, colby.edu
Legislation affecting the renewable energy market, doe.gov
Congressional energy brief, ncseonline.org
FuelEconomy.gov Frequently Asked Questions
Gas Guzzler Tax: Program Overview Environmental Protection Agency
Feebates, rebates and gas-guzzler taxes: a study of incentives for increased fuel economy
Gas Guzzler Tax Table

1978 in law
United States federal taxation legislation
United States federal energy legislation
95th United States Congress
United States federal legislation articles without infoboxes
Environmental tax